Francis Paul Dilio (April 12, 1912 – January 26, 1997) was a Canadian ice hockey administrator in Quebec and is a member of the Hockey Hall of Fame. He served as the registrar and secretary of the Hockey Québec. The Quebec Major Junior Hockey League named one of its divisions after him, along with Robert Lebel.

References

External links
 

1912 births
1997 deaths
Hockey Hall of Fame inductees
Ice hockey people from Montreal
Quebec Major Junior Hockey League executives